Wilhem Belocian (born 25 June 1995) is a French hurdler and sprinter from Guadeloupe.

Career
Belocian won the 110 metre hurdles bronze medal at the 2011 World Youth Championships in Athletics, in a personal best of 13.51 seconds. He won the 110 metre hurdles gold medal at the 2014 World Junior Championships in a world junior record time of 12.99 seconds. Belocian withdrew from the 2015 World Championships in Athletics because of a thigh injury sustained in mid July 2015. Belocian was disqualified due to a false start in the 2016 Summer Olympics.

References

External links

1995 births
Living people
People from Les Abymes
French male hurdlers
Guadeloupean male hurdlers
Guadeloupean male sprinters
European Athletics Championships medalists
Athletes (track and field) at the 2016 Summer Olympics
Olympic athletes of France
Olympic male hurdlers
French Athletics Championships winners
European Athletics Indoor Championships winners
Athletes (track and field) at the 2020 Summer Olympics
Universiade medalists in athletics (track and field)
Universiade silver medalists for France